Cael Norman Sanderson (born June 20, 1979) is an American former folkstyle and freestyle wrestler who is the current head coach of Penn State's wrestling team. As a wrestler, he won an Olympic gold medal and was undefeated in four years of college wrestling at Iowa State (159–0), becoming a four-time NCAA Division I champion (1999–2002). He is the only wrestler in NCAA Division I history to go undefeated in official matches with more than 100 wins. Sports Illustrated named his college career as the second most impressive college sports feat of all-time, behind the setting of four world records by Jesse Owens in a single hour at the 1935 Big Ten track and field conference championship meet.

Early life
Born in Salt Lake City, Utah, to Steve and Debbie Sanderson, Cael attended Wasatch High School in Heber City, Utah, where he was coached by his father, a former wrestler at Brigham Young University. As a high school wrestler, Sanderson was a four-time UHSAA state champion (1994–97) and compiled a record of 127–3.

Wrestling career

College 
Upon graduation, Sanderson followed his brothers, Cody and Cole, to Iowa State. After redshirting in 1997-98, Sanderson won all 39 of his matches to win his first NCAA and Big 12 Conference titles at 184 pounds. He was also the first freshman in NCAA history to be named the Outstanding Wrestler at nationals. His next three seasons were virtually identical, compiling 40 wins and no losses in each and finishing with the only perfect record in NCAA Division I history at 159-0. By winning all of his matches, he became only the second wrestler in history to that point to win four NCAA Division I titles. He was also named the Outstanding Wrestler in all NCAA tournaments he competed in.

Sanderson was a three-time Dan Hodge Trophy winner (collegiate wrestling's equivalent to the Heisman Trophy), being the first to win the award multiple times and the only person to win it three times. He holds the longest win-streak across all NCAA divisions. This makes him the most accomplished collegiate wrestler ever.

In 2017, Sanderson was inducted into the Iowa State Hall of Fame.

Freestyle 
Sanderson was a two-time US Cadet World Team Member, placing third and fourth in 1994 and 1995, respectively. He was also a US University National Champion in 1999 and a University World Champion in 2000.

He became the US National Champion in 2001, 2002 and 2003. He was also an original US World Team Member in 2001 and 2002, however, he chose not to participate at the 01' World Championships to focus in folkstyle, and the USA team chose to not compete in 2002.

In 2003, he won the Manitoba Open in Canada in February, placed second at the World Cup in April, third at the 2003 Pan American Games and second at the World Championships. In 2004, he once again claimed the Manitoba Open title and won the US Olympic Team Trials.

At the 2004 Summer Olympics, Sanderson claimed wins over Magomed Kurugliyev, Siarhei Borchanka, Majid Khodaei, Yoel Romero and Moon Eui-jae to become an Olympic Gold medalist in Athens, Greece.

While already a full-time coach at Penn State, Sanderson came out of retirement in 2011 and took home an Ion Corneanu Memorial title, won the US World Team Trials and placed fifth at the World Championships.

In 2011, Sanderson was inducted into the National Wrestling Hall of Fame as a Distinguished Member.

Freestyle record

! colspan="7"| World Championships & Olympics
|-
!  Res.
!  Record
!  Opponent
!  Score
!  Date
!  Event
!  Location
|-
! style=background:white colspan=7 |
|-
|Loss
|13–3
|align=left| Albert Saritov
|style="font-size:88%"|0–1, 0–3
|style="font-size:88%" rowspan=6|September 17, 2011
|style="font-size:88%" rowspan=6|2011 World Wrestling Championships
|style="text-align:left;font-size:88%;" rowspan=6| Istanbul, Turkey
|-
|Win
|13–2
|align=left| Alireza Goudarzi
|style="font-size:88%"|6–0, 1–0
|-
|Win
|12–2
|align=left| Yermek Baiduashov
|style="font-size:88%"|4–3, 0–1, 2–1
|-
|Win
|11–2
|align=left| Yoon Chan-uk
|style="font-size:88%"|Fall
|-
|Loss
|10–2
|align=left| Sharif Sharifov
|style="font-size:88%"|1-3, 1-4
|-
|Win
|10–1
|align=left| Alejandro Gallardo
|style="font-size:88%"|6–0, 7–0
|-
! style=background:white colspan=7 |
|-
|Win
|9–1
|align=left| Moon Eui-jae
|style="font-size:88%"|3–1
|style="font-size:88%" rowspan=5|August 28, 2004
|style="font-size:88%" rowspan=5|2004 Olympic Games
|style="text-align:left;font-size:88%;" rowspan=5| Athens, Greece
|-
|Win
|8–1
|align=left| Yoel Romero
|style="font-size:88%"|3–2
|-
|Win
|7–1
|align=left| Majid Khodaei
|style="font-size:88%"|6–5
|-
|Win
|6–1
|align=left| Siarhei Borchanka
|style="font-size:88%"|9–1
|-
|Win
|5–1
|align=left| Magomed Kurugliyev
|style="font-size:88%"|4–2
|-
! style=background:white colspan=7 |
|-
|Loss
|4–1
|align=left| Sazhid Sazhidov
|style="font-size:88%"|3–4
|style="font-size:88%" rowspan=5|September 12, 2003
|style="font-size:88%" rowspan=5|2003 World Wrestling Championships
|style="text-align:left;font-size:88%;" rowspan=5| New York, New York
|-
|Win
|4–0
|align=left| Rezav Mindorashvili
|style="font-size:88%"|4–2
|-
|Win
|3–0
|align=left| Mahmed Aghaev
|style="font-size:88%"|3–0
|-
|Win
|2–0
|align=left| Majid Khodaei
|style="font-size:88%"|8–2
|-
|Win
|1–0
|align=left| Tero Perkkioe
|style="font-size:88%"|8–2

NCAA record

! colspan="8"| NCAA Championships Matches
|-
!  Res.
!  Record
!  Opponent
!  Score
!  Date
!  Event
|-
! style=background:white colspan=6 |2002 NCAA Championships  at 197 
|-
|Win
|159-0
|align=left|Jon Trenge
|style="font-size:88%"|MAJ 12-4
|style="font-size:88%" rowspan=5|March 21–23, 2002
|style="font-size:88%" rowspan=5|2002 NCAA Division I Wrestling Championships
|-
|Win
|158-0
|align=left|Nick Preston
|style="font-size:88%"|MAJ 18-7
|-
|Win
|157-0
|align=left|Jason Payne
|style="font-size:88%"|TF 23-8
|-
|Win
|156-0
|align=left|Kyle Cerminara
|style="font-size:88%"|PIN 6:33
|-
|Win
|155-0
|align=left|Eric Mausser 
|style="font-size:88%"|PIN 3:32
|-
|Win
|154-0
|align=left|Scott Barker
|style="font-size:88%"|TF 22-7
|-
|Win
|153-0
|align=left|Tom Grossman
|style="font-size:88%"|Fall
|-
|Win
|152-0
|align=left|William Gruenwald
|style="font-size:88%"|Fall
|-
|Win
|151-0
|align=left|Jon Trenge
|style="font-size:88%"|6-1
|-
|Win
|150-0
|align=left|Jason Gore
|style="font-size:88%"|Fall
|-
|Win
|149-0
|align=left|Unknown
|style="font-size:88%"|Forfeit
|-
|Win
|148-0
|align=left|Kyle Smith
|style="font-size:88%"|Fall
|-
|Win
|147-0
|align=left|Will Gruenwald
|style="font-size:88%"|Fall
|-
|Win
|146-0
|align=left|Bill Stouffer
|style="font-size:88%"|Fall
|-
|Win
|145-0
|align=left|Tom Grossman
|style="font-size:88%"|Fall
|-
|Win
|144-0
|align=left|Erik Gladish
|style="font-size:88%"|Fall
|-
|Win
|143-0
|align=left|Jason Payne
|style="font-size:88%"|Fall
|-
|Win
|142-0
|align=left|Lee Fullhart
|style="font-size:88%"|5-3
|-
|Win
|141-0
|align=left|Jon Trenge
|style="font-size:88%"|MD 16-5
|-
|Win
|140-0
|align=left|Chris Skretkowlz
|style="font-size:88%"|TF 22-5
|-
|Win
|139-0
|align=left|Nick Curby
|style="font-size:88%"|Fall
|-
|Win
|138-0
|align=left|Jim Kassner
|style="font-size:88%"|Fall
|-
|Win
|137-0
|align=left|Ryan Fulsaas
|style="font-size:88%"|Fall
|-
|Win
|136-0
|align=left|Jareck Horton
|style="font-size:88%"|Fall
|-
|Win
|135-0
|align=left|Bart George
|style="font-size:88%"|Fall
|-
|Win
|134-0
|align=left|Unknown
|style="font-size:88%"|Forfeit
|-
|Win
|133-0
|align=left|Joe Compton
|style="font-size:88%"|TF 23-7
|-
|Win
|132-0
|align=left|Aaron Granell
|style="font-size:88%"|Fall
|-
|Win
|131-0
|align=left|Brent Miller
|style="font-size:88%"|TF 20-5
|-
|Win
|130-0
|align=left|Greg Sawyer
|style="font-size:88%"|TF
|-
|Win
|129-0
|align=left|Daegen Smith
|style="font-size:88%"|Fall
|-
|Win
|128-0
|align=left|Peter Mosley
|style="font-size:88%"|Fall
|-
|Win
|127-0
|align=left|Nick Thomas
|style="font-size:88%"|Fall
|-
|Win
|126-0
|align=left|Chris Skretkowicz
|style="font-size:88%"|Fall
|-
|Win
|125-0
|align=left|Wallace
|style="font-size:88%"|Fall
|-
|Win
|124-0
|align=left|Bietz
|style="font-size:88%"|TF
|-
|Win
|123-0
|align=left|Broadway
|style="font-size:88%"|TF
|-
|Win
|122-0
|align=left|Kovarik
|style="font-size:88%"|Fall
|-
! style=background:white colspan=6 |2001 NCAA Championships  at 184 lbs
|-
|Win
|121-0
|align=left|Daniel Cormier
|style="font-size:88%"|8-4
|style="font-size:88%" rowspan=5|March 15–17, 2001
|style="font-size:88%" rowspan=5|2001 NCAA Division I Wrestling Championships
|-
|Win
|120-0
|align=left|Victor Sveda
|style="font-size:88%"|MD 21-7
|-
|Win
|119-0
|align=left|Jessman Smith
|style="font-size:88%"|TF 21-6
|-
|Win
|118-0
|align=left|Jeremy Wilson
|style="font-size:88%"|Fall
|-
|Win
|117-0
|align=left|Kyle Hanson
|style="font-size:88%"|TF 24-9
|-
|Win
|116-0
|align=left|Scott Barker
|style="font-size:88%"|TF 22-7
|-
|Win
|115-0
|align=left|Daniel Cormier
|style="font-size:88%"|8-3
|-
|Win
|114-0
|align=left|Ry Stone
|style="font-size:88%"|Fall
|-
|Win
|113-0
|align=left|Kyle Hansen
|style="font-size:88%"|MD 21-8
|-
|Win
|112-0
|align=left|Matt Fletcher
|style="font-size:88%"|Fall
|-
|Win
|111-0
|align=left|R.D. Pursell
|style="font-size:88%"|Fall
|-
|Win
|110-0
|align=left|Ry Stone
|style="font-size:88%"|Fall
|-
|Win
|109-0
|align=left|Josh Lambrecht
|style="font-size:88%"|TF 21-10
|-
|Win
|108-0
|align=left|Shawn Scannel
|style="font-size:88%"|Fall
|-
|Win
|107-0
|align=left|Daniel Cormier
|style="font-size:88%"|10-3
|-
|Win
|106-0
|align=left|Jessman Smith
|style="font-size:88%"|TF
|-
|Win
|105-0
|align=left|Andy Hrovat
|style="font-size:88%"|Fall
|-
|Win
|104-0
|align=left|Daniel Cormier
|style="font-size:88%"|MD 14-3
|-
|Win
|103-0
|align=left|Josh Lambrecht
|style="font-size:88%"|MD 16-8
|-
|Win
|102-0
|align=left|Ed Aliakseyenka
|style="font-size:88%"|TF
|-
|Win
|101-0
|align=left|Ralph Everett
|style="font-size:88%"|Fall
|-
|Win
|100-0
|align=left|Jason Rossotti
|style="font-size:88%"|Fall
|-
|Win
|99-0
|align=left|Ralph DeNisco
|style="font-size:88%"|MD 17-6
|-
|Win
|98-0
|align=left|Francis Volpe
|style="font-size:88%"|TF
|-
|Win
|97-0
|align=left|Nate Patrick
|style="font-size:88%"|MD 16-7
|-
|Win
|96-0
|align=left|Viktor Sveda
|style="font-size:88%"|MD 14-5
|-
|Win
|95-0
|align=left|Francis Volpe
|style="font-size:88%"|Fall
|-
|Win
|94-0
|align=left|Marcus Schontube
|style="font-size:88%"|16-10
|-
|Win
|93-0
|align=left|Josh Bocks
|style="font-size:88%"|Fall
|-
|Win
|92-0
|align=left|Jessman Smith
|style="font-size:88%"|Fall
|-
|Win
|91-0
|align=left|Jeff Pangborn
|style="font-size:88%"|Fall
|-
|Win
|90-0
|align=left|Adam Kellogg
|style="font-size:88%"|Fall
|-
|Win
|89-0
|align=left|Bert Watford
|style="font-size:88%"|Fall
|-
|Win
|88-0
|align=left|Paul Okins
|style="font-size:88%"|TF 19-3
|-
|Win
|87-0
|align=left|Ben Blood
|style="font-size:88%"|TF 18-3
|-
|Win
|86-0
|align=left|Anton Talamantes
|style="font-size:88%"|MD 20-6
|-
|Win
|85-0
|align=left|Mike Odle
|style="font-size:88%"|Fall
|-
|Win
|84-0
|align=left|Viktor Sveda
|style="font-size:88%"|MD 16-3
|-
|Win
|83-0
|align=left|Josh Lambrecht
|style="font-size:88%"|MD 12-4
|-
|Win
|82-0
|align=left|Ralph DeNisco
|style="font-size:88%"|Fall
|-
|Win
|81-0
|align=left|Curcio
|style="font-size:88%"|Fall
|-
! style=background:white colspan=6 |2000 NCAA Championships  at 184 lbs
|-
|Win
|80-0
|align=left|Vertus Jones
|style="font-size:88%"|MD 19-6
|style="font-size:88%" rowspan=5|March 16–18, 2000
|style="font-size:88%" rowspan=5|2000 NCAA Division I Wrestling Championships
|-
|Win
|79-0
|align=left|Brandon Eggum
|style="font-size:88%"|MD 16-5
|-
|Win
|78-0
|align=left|Rob Rohn
|style="font-size:88%"|TF 20-5
|-
|Win
|77-0
|align=left|Dax Pecaro
|style="font-size:88%"|TF 21-6
|-
|Win
|76-0
|align=left|Adam Schaaf
|style="font-size:88%"|Fall
|-
|Win
|75-0
|align=left|Daniel Cormier
|style="font-size:88%"|8-4
|-
|Win
|74-0
|align=left|Tom Grossman
|style="font-size:88%"|MD 17-7
|-
|Win
|73-0
|align=left|Kyle Hansen
|style="font-size:88%"|Fall
|-
|Win
|72-0
|align=left|Charles McTorry
|style="font-size:88%"|TF 22-6
|-
|Win
|71-0
|align=left|Mike Marshall
|style="font-size:88%"|Fall
|-
|Win
|70-0
|align=left|John Maze
|style="font-size:88%"|TF 27-10
|-
|Win
|69-0
|align=left|Brandon Eggum
|style="font-size:88%"|6-1
|-
|Win
|68-0
|align=left|Tom Grossman
|style="font-size:88%"|TF 19-4
|-
|Win
|67-0
|align=left|Daniel Cormier
|style="font-size:88%"|MD 20-9
|-
|Win
|66-0
|align=left|Brandon Eggum
|style="font-size:88%"|MD 8-0
|-
|Win
|65-0
|align=left|Tom Grossman
|style="font-size:88%"|Fall
|-
|Win
|64-0
|align=left|Lionel Halsey
|style="font-size:88%"|Fall
|-
|Win
|63-0
|align=left|Jeff Knupp
|style="font-size:88%"|TF 21-6
|-
|Win
|62-0
|align=left|Unknown
|style="font-size:88%"|Forfeit
|-
|Win
|61-0
|align=left|Dave Murray
|style="font-size:88%"|Fall
|-
|Win
|60-0
|align=left|Cash Edwards
|style="font-size:88%"|TF
|-
|Win
|59-0
|align=left|Isaac Weber
|style="font-size:88%"|MD 16-7
|-
|Win
|58-0
|align=left|Nate Patrick
|style="font-size:88%"|7-2
|-
|Win
|57-0
|align=left|Kevin Vogel
|style="font-size:88%"|MD 17-5
|-
|Win
|56-0
|align=left|Lionel Halsey
|style="font-size:88%"|5-1
|-
|Win
|55-0
|align=left|Sean Salmon
|style="font-size:88%"|TF 20-5
|-
|Win
|54-0
|align=left|Brian Falciglia
|style="font-size:88%"|Fall
|-
|Win
|53-0
|align=left|Joe Cotant
|style="font-size:88%"|TF 20-5
|-
|Win
|52-0
|align=left|Donavan True
|style="font-size:88%"|Fall
|-
|Win
|51-0
|align=left|Paul Jenn
|style="font-size:88%"|DQ
|-
|Win
|50-0
|align=left|Joel Schrimpf
|style="font-size:88%"|Fall
|-
|Win
|49-0
|align=left|Nathan Ackerman
|style="font-size:88%"|TF 17-2
|-
|Win
|48-0
|align=left|B.J. Shelley
|style="font-size:88%"|TF 22-6
|-
|Win
|47-0
|align=left|Chad Karnal
|style="font-size:88%"|Fall
|-
|Win
|46-0
|align=left|Joe Terrill
|style="font-size:88%"|TF 23-7
|-
|Win
|45-0
|align=left|Damion Hahn
|style="font-size:88%"|4-3
|-
|Win
|44-0
|align=left|Jessman Smith
|style="font-size:88%"|TF 17-2
|-
|Win
|43-0
|align=left|Andorf
|style="font-size:88%"|MD 17-7
|-
|Win
|42-0
|align=left|Swarm
|style="font-size:88%"|TF 24-5
|-
|Win
|41-0
|align=left|Brandon Eggum
|style="font-size:88%"|7-4
|-
|Win
|40-0
|align=left|Schmauss
|style="font-size:88%"|Fall
|-
|Win
|39-0
|align=left|Bouwman
|style="font-size:88%"|20-5
|-
|Win
|38-0
|align=left|Ryan Rettke
|style="font-size:88%"|TF 26-11
|-
! style=background:white colspan=6 |1999 NCAA Championships  at 184 lbs
|-
|Win
|37-0
|align=left|Brandon Eggum
|style="font-size:88%"|6-1
|style="font-size:88%" rowspan=5|March 18–20, 1999
|style="font-size:88%" rowspan=5|1999 NCAA Division I Wrestling Championships
|-
|Win
|36-0
|align=left|Brad Vering
|style="font-size:88%"|Fall
|-
|Win
|35-0
|align=left|Andy Hrovat
|style="font-size:88%"|Fall
|-
|Win
|34-0
|align=left|Nate Patrick
|style="font-size:88%"|MD 18-6
|-
|Win
|33-0
|align=left|Josh Dideon
|style="font-size:88%"|Fall
|-
|Win
|32-0
|align=left|Brad Vering
|style="font-size:88%"|9-5
|-
|Win
|31-0
|align=left|Tom Grossman
|style="font-size:88%"|MD 13-5
|-
|Win
|30-0
|align=left|Ken Bigley
|style="font-size:88%"|TF
|-
|Win
|29-0
|align=left|Casey Strand
|style="font-size:88%"|6-2
|-
|Win
|28-0
|align=left|Tony Spiker
|style="font-size:88%"|Fall
|-
|Win
|27-0
|align=left|Jason Moore
|style="font-size:88%"|MD 19-6
|-
|Win
|26-0
|align=left|Matt Carpenter
|style="font-size:88%"|TF 22-7
|-
|Win
|25-0
|align=left|Scott Coleman
|style="font-size:88%"|MD 17-7
|-
|Win
|24-0
|align=left|Vertus Jones
|style="font-size:88%"|6-5
|-
|Win
|23-0
|align=left|Unknown
|style="font-size:88%"|Forfeit
|-
|Win
|22-0
|align=left|Tom Grossman
|style="font-size:88%"|Fall
|-
|Win
|21-0
|align=left|Mark Munoz
|style="font-size:88%"|MD 10-2
|-
|Win
|20-0
|align=left|Paul Jenn
|style="font-size:88%"|TF MD 10-2
|-
|Win
|19-0
|align=left|Tom Grossman
|style="font-size:88%"|MD 20-8
|-
|Win
|18-0
|align=left|Mark Munoz
|style="font-size:88%"|5-1
|-
|Win
|17-0
|align=left|Casey Strand
|style="font-size:88%"|Fall
|-
|Win
|16-0
|align=left|Tom Ciezki
|style="font-size:88%"|6-3
|-
|Win
|15-0
|align=left|Nate Patrick
|style="font-size:88%"|7-2
|-
|Win
|14-0
|align=left|Ryan Rettke
|style="font-size:88%"|Fall
|-
|Win
|13-0
|align=left|John Van Doren
|style="font-size:88%"|11-4
|-
|Win
|12-0
|align=left|Aaron Simpson
|style="font-size:88%"|TF 9-3
|-
|Win
|11-0
|align=left|Greg Gingeleskie
|style="font-size:88%"|5-0
|-
|Win
|10-0
|align=left|James Brimm
|style="font-size:88%"|5-0
|-
|Win
|9-0
|align=left|Mike Gadsby
|style="font-size:88%"|TF 19-4
|-
|Win
|8-0
|align=left|Tom Ciezki
|style="font-size:88%"|TF 23-7
|-
|Win
|7-0
|align=left|Paul Jenn
|style="font-size:88%"|TF 19-4
|-
|Win
|6-0
|align=left|William Rufis
|style="font-size:88%"|Fall
|-
|Win
|5-0
|align=left|B.J. Shelley
|style="font-size:88%"|Fall
|-
|Win
|4-0
|align=left|Brant LaGrange
|style="font-size:88%"|MD 21-8
|-
|Win
|3-0
|align=left|Steve Burleson
|style="font-size:88%"|Fall
|-
|Win
|2-0
|align=left|Joe Brougard
|style="font-size:88%"|TF 20-5
|-
|Win
|1-0
|align=left|George Flannick
|style="font-size:88%"|TF 20-5
|-

Coaching career

Iowa State 
Sanderson began his wrestling coaching career with the season ending in 2004 as a special assistant for Iowa State. After short stints in associate head coaching positions, he became the head coach for the season ending in 2007. In three seasons, Sanderson led Iowa State to NCAA Division I finishes of second, fifth, and third overall. He also coached his wrestlers to two individual NCAA Division I national titles.

Penn State 
Before the 2010 season ended, Sanderson became the head coach of Penn State's wrestling team. As of 2023, Sanderson's Penn State teams have won ten NCAA Division I team titles. During that time, he also coached his wrestlers to 32 individual NCAA Division I titles.

Coaching results

! colspan=6| Coaching Record
|-
! Season
! Team Finish
! Dual Record
! All Americans
! National Champions
|-
! style=background:white colspan=5|Iowa State University
|-
|  style="background:white; font-size:88%;"|2007
|style="font-size:88%"|
|style="font-size:88%"|13-3-0
|style="font-size:88%"|4
|style="font-size:88%"|1
|-
|  style="background:white; font-size:88%;"|2008
|style="font-size:88%"|5th
|style="font-size:88%"|16-4-0
|style="font-size:88%"|7
|style="font-size:88%"|0
|-
|  style="background:white; font-size:88%;"|2009
|style="font-size:88%"|
|style="font-size:88%"|15-3-0
|style="font-size:88%"|4
|style="font-size:88%"|1
|-
! style=background:white colspan=5|Pennsylvania State University
|-
|  style="background:white; font-size:88%;"|2010
|style="font-size:88%"|9th
|style="font-size:88%"|13-6-1
|style="font-size:88%"|3
|style="font-size:88%"|0
|-
|  style="background:white; font-size:88%;"|2011
|style="font-size:88%"|
|style="font-size:88%"|17-1-1
|style="font-size:88%"|5
|style="font-size:88%"|1
|-
|  style="background:white; font-size:88%;"|2012
|style="font-size:88%"|
|style="font-size:88%"|13-1-0
|style="font-size:88%"|6
|style="font-size:88%"|3
|-
|  style="background:white; font-size:88%;"|2013
|style="font-size:88%"|
|style="font-size:88%"|13-1-0
|style="font-size:88%"|5
|style="font-size:88%"|2
|-
|  style="background:white; font-size:88%;"|2014
|style="font-size:88%"|
|style="font-size:88%"|15-1-0
|style="font-size:88%"|7
|style="font-size:88%"|2
|-
|  style="background:white; font-size:88%;"|2015
|style="font-size:88%"|6th
|style="font-size:88%"|11-4-0
|style="font-size:88%"|5
|style="font-size:88%"|1
|-
|  style="background:white; font-size:88%;"|2016
|style="font-size:88%"|
|style="font-size:88%"|16-0-0
|style="font-size:88%"|6
|style="font-size:88%"|2
|-
|  style="background:white; font-size:88%;"|2017
|style="font-size:88%"|
|style="font-size:88%"|14-0-0
|style="font-size:88%"|6
|style="font-size:88%"|5
|-
|  style="background:white; font-size:88%;"|2018
|style="font-size:88%"|
|style="font-size:88%"|14-0-0
|style="font-size:88%"|8
|style="font-size:88%"|4
|-
|  style="background:white; font-size:88%;"|2019
|style="font-size:88%"|
|style="font-size:88%"|14-0-0
|style="font-size:88%"|7
|style="font-size:88%"|3
|-
|  style="background:white; font-size:88%;"|2020
|style="font-size:88%"|DNC
|style="font-size:88%"|12-2-0
|style="font-size:88%"|5
|style="font-size:88%"|0
|-
|  style="background:white; font-size:88%;"|2021
|style="font-size:88%"|
|style="font-size:88%"|6-0-0
|style="font-size:88%"|6
|style="font-size:88%"|4
|-
|  style="background:white; font-size:88%;"|2022
|style="font-size:88%"|
|style="font-size:88%"|17-0-0
|style="font-size:88%"|6
|style="font-size:88%"|5
|-
| colspan="2"  style="background:LIGHTgrey; font-size:88%;"|Career
|  style="background:LIGHTgrey; font-size:88%;"|219-26-2
|  style="background:LIGHTgrey; font-size:88%;"|90
|  style="background:LIGHTgrey; font-size:88%;"|34

Awards and honors

2011
 Ion Corneanu Memorial

2004
 Summer Olympics
 Manitoba Open
John Smith Award as the Freestyle Wrestler of the Year

2003
 World Wrestling Championships
 Pan American Games
 Manitoba Open
John Smith Award as the Freestyle Wrestler of the Year

2002
Best Male College Athlete ESPY Award
Dan Hodge Trophy winner
NCAA Division I Championships Outstanding Wrestler
 NCAA Division I
 Big 12 Conference

2001
Dan Hodge Trophy winner
NCAA Division I Championships Outstanding Wrestler
 NCAA Division I
 Big 12 Conference

2000
Dan Hodge Trophy winner
NCAA Division I Championships Outstanding Wrestler
 NCAA Division I
 Big 12 Conference

1999
NCAA Division I Championships Outstanding Wrestler
 NCAA Division I
 Big 12 Conference

Other honors
Iowa Sports Hall of Fame inductee
Iowa State Cyclones Hall of Fame inductee
National Wrestling Hall of Fame Distinguished Member
Sports Illustrated cover appearance
Wheaties cereal box appearance

See also
List of Pennsylvania State University Olympians
Aleksandr_Karelin

References

External links
 
 Cael Sanderson Official Site (caelsanderson.com)
 Cael Sanderson Penn State Bio (gopsusports.com)
 

1979 births
Living people
American male sport wrestlers
American wrestling coaches
Iowa State Cyclones wrestling coaches
Iowa State Cyclones wrestlers
Olympic gold medalists for the United States in wrestling
Penn State Nittany Lions wrestling coaches
Wrestlers at the 2004 Summer Olympics
People from Heber City, Utah
Sportspeople from Salt Lake City
American Latter Day Saints
Medalists at the 2004 Summer Olympics
World Wrestling Championships medalists
Pan American Games bronze medalists for the United States
Pan American Games medalists in wrestling
Wrestlers at the 2003 Pan American Games
Medalists at the 2003 Pan American Games